The White Outlaw is a 1925 American silent Western film directed by Clifford Smith and written by Isadore Bernstein. The film stars Jack Hoxie, Marceline Day, William Welsh, Duke R. Lee, Floyd Shackelford, and Charles Brinley. The film was released on September 6, 1925, by Universal Pictures.

Plot
As described in a film magazine review, when a rancher loses his trick horse, he vows his determination to recover the animal. One of the ranch hands is responsible for the runaway of the horse. The foreman of the ranch accuses the rancher of stealing horses, but it is found that the wild horse had released all the other horses. Jack captures the wild horse and saves a stampede, rescuing his sweetheart Mary. His honor and courage are vindicated, and he wins the young woman.

Cast

References

External links

 
 

1925 films
1925 Western (genre) films
Universal Pictures films
Films directed by Clifford Smith
American black-and-white films
Silent American Western (genre) films
1920s English-language films
1920s American films